"All There" is a song by American rapper Jeezy featuring late American rapper Bankroll Fresh. It was released on October 6, 2016, as the second single from Jeezy's seventh studio album, Trap or Die 3 (2016). The track was produced by D. Rich.

Music video
The music video for "All There"  (Directed By Pilot Industries) premiered on October 6, 2016, via WorldStarHipHop. It was uploaded to Jeezy's official VEVO channel on October 31, 2016.

In popular culture
In March 2018, the song was played in the second episode of comedy-drama television series Atlanta's second season.

Charts

References

2016 songs
2016 singles
Jeezy songs
Def Jam Recordings singles
Songs written by Jeezy